Félicité is a 2017 Senegalese drama film set in the Democratic Republic of the Congo and directed by Alain Gomis. It was selected to compete for the Golden Bear in the main competition section of the 67th Berlin International Film Festival. At Berlin, the film won the Jury Grand Prix award. At the 2017 Africa Movie Academy Awards, it won six awards which is the highest for a film in the history of the award ceremony, including categories for best film, best actress, best supporting actor, best editing, best soundtrack and best film in an African language.

It was selected as the Senegalese entry for the Best Foreign Language Film at the 90th Academy Awards, making the December shortlist. It was the first time Senegal had sent a film for consideration for the Best Foreign Language film.

Plot
The film tells the story of how a bar entertainer struggles to get funds after her child is hospitalized.

Cast
 Véro Tshanda Beya Mputu as Félicité
 Gaetan Claudia as Samo
 Papi Mpaka as Tabu
 Nadine Ndebo as Hortense
 Elbas Manuana as Luisant
 Kasai Allstars as themselves

Reception
On review aggregator website Rotten Tomatoes, the film has an approval rating of 97% based on 36 reviews, and an average rating of 6.9/10. On Metacritic, which assigns a weighted average score, the film holds a score of 75 out of 100, based on reviews from 13 critics, indicating "generally favorable reviews". Jordan Mintzer of The Hollywood Reporter described the film as "rough and heartfelt".

See also
 List of submissions to the 90th Academy Awards for Best Foreign Language Film
 List of Senegalese submissions for the Academy Award for Best Foreign Language Film

References

External links
 

2017 films
2017 drama films
French drama films
2010s French-language films
Lingala-language films
Silver Bear Grand Jury Prize winners
Senegalese drama films
2010s French films